TIROS 3 (or TIROS-C) was a spin-stabilized meteorological satellite. It was the third in a series of Television Infrared Observation Satellites.

Launch 

TIROS 3 was launched on July 12, 1961, by a Thor-Delta rocket from Cape Canaveral Air Force Station, Florida. The spacecraft functioned nominally until January 22, 1962. The satellite orbited the Earth once every 98 minutes, at an inclination of 47.9°.

Mission 
The satellite was in the form of an 18-sided right prism, 107 cm in diameter and 56 cm high. The top and sides of the spacecraft were covered with approximately 9000 1- by 2-cm silicon solar cells. TIROS 3 was equipped with two independent television camera subsystems for taking cloudcover pictures, plus a two-channel low-resolution radiometer, an omnidirectional radiometer, and a five-channel infrared scanning radiometer. All three radiometers were used for measuring radiation from the earth and its atmosphere.

The satellite spin rate was maintained between 8 and 12 rpm by use of five diametrically opposed pairs of small, solid-fuel thrusters. The satellite spin axis could be oriented to within 1- to 2-deg accuracy by use of a magnetic control device consisting of 250 cores of wire wound around the outer surface of the spacecraft. The interaction between the induced magnetic field in the spacecraft and the earth's magnetic field provided the necessary torque for attitude control. The flight control system also optimized the performance of the solar cells and TV cameras and protected the five-channel infrared radiometer from prolonged exposure to direct sunlight. The spacecraft performed normally until August 1961, when the scanning radiometer began to fail. Performance was sporadic until January 23, 1962. It was deactivated on February 28, 1962.

References

External links
 NOAA in space. NOAA
 Department of Eaarth, Atmosphere, Ocean & Atmosphere - Tiros 3. Florida State University

Weather satellites of the United States
Spacecraft launched in 1961